The Chief of Staff of the Air and Space Force (JEMAE) is a four-star general that under the authority of the defence minister exercises command over the Spanish Air and Space Force, and as such is the principal military advisor to the Chief of the Defence Staff, the Minister of Defence, the Secretary of State for Defence and the Under Secretary of Defence. It's also a member of the Council of Chiefs of Staff and a military advisor to the National Defence Council.

The JEMAE has two main roles: the support role by which advice the Minister of Defence about the Air and Space Force military policy, the JEMAD about how to use the personnel and their operative status, the SEDEF about the economic, armamentistic and infraestructure policies and the Under Secretary about the personnel and teaching policy; and the operative role by which prepare the force for combat, instructs the military personnel, establishes the organization of its military branch and watches over the welfare of the personnel under his command and evaluates the needs of the Air and Space Force.

The Chief of the Air and Space Force convenes the meetings and coordinates the efforts of the Air Staff (EMA), the main support body of the JEMAE, responsible for providing the necessary elements of judgment to base its decisions, translate these into orders and ensure their fulfillment. The EMA has a whole body of military officers at its service, and among the main officers are include the Second Chief of Staff of the Air and Space Force (SEJEMAE), the Permanent Secretary of the Superior Council of the Air and Space Force, the Chief General of the Secretariat General of the Air and Space Staff (SEGE), the Chief General of Technical Services and Information Systems and Telecommunications and its Chef de Cabinet.

The position is currently held by General of the Air Javier Salto Martínez-Avial.

History
The position of Chief of Air Staff was created in 1936, when Apolinar Sáenz de Buruaga y Polanco was promoted to Colonel and appointed Chief of Staff of the Air and Space Force. Sáenz de Buruaga y Polanco was not what is today the JEMAE, because at that time, the JEMA was subordinated to a higher rank called Chief of the Air.

The position was not institutionalized until the creation of the Air Ministry in 1939, creating in turn the Air Staff. According to the Air Force Act of that year, the command of the air force belonged to the Head of State, and he delegated it to the Minister of the Air. With this ministry it was wanted to give the air weapon (which had been so important to win the Civil War) the same level that the Army or the Navy had.

The Air Staff was made up of the Chief of Staff of the Air Force, the Second Chief of Staff of the Air Force, a private secretariat for the JEMA and a general one for the Air and Space Staff, and 5 sections: Organization, instruction and mobilization; Information; Operations; Services and Cartography.

At that time, the JEMA exercised its powers over all the aerial resources of the Armed Forces, both those of the Air Force and the aerial means of the Army and the Navy, but always coordinating with the other Chiefs of Staff, although in practice the commanders of the air forces of the Army and of the Navy were of those respective branches, reason why the influence of the JEMA was null. The JEMA was part, together with the Under Secretary of Air and other ministerial officials, of the Administrative Technical Board, permanent advisory body of the Armed Forces Command on the election of prototypes of aircraft and engines, contracts, infrastructure programs, acquisitions, etc., and of the High Command (AEM) (that acted as a simple coordinating body).

The JEMA depended on the Ministry of the Air until the disappearance of this in 1977. Since then, the JEMA has depended on the Ministry of Defence.

List of Chiefs of Staff of the Air and Space Force

(*) Promoted posthumously to General of the Air in 1999.
(**) Promoted to General of the Air ad honorem in 1999.
(***) Promoted to General of the Air while in office.

See also
 Chief of the Defence Staff
 Ministers of Defence
 Captain general of the Air Force
 Spanish Air and Space Force
 Chief of Staff of the Navy
 Chief of Staff of the Army

References

Military of Spain
Spain